"Heaven in My Woman's Eyes" is a song written by Mark Nesler, and recorded by American country music artist Tracy Byrd.  It was released in January 1996 as the third single from his album Love Lessons. The song reached number 14 on the Billboard Hot Country Singles & Tracks chart in April 1996.

Chart performance

References

1996 singles
1995 songs
Tracy Byrd songs
MCA Records singles
Songs written by Mark Nesler
Song recordings produced by Tony Brown (record producer)